|}

The Monksfield Novice Hurdle is a Grade 3 National Hunt novice hurdle race in Ireland which is open to horses aged four years or older. It is run at Navan over a distance of about 2 miles and 4 furlongs (4,023 metres), and it is scheduled to take place each year in November.

The event was first run in 1995 and is named after Monksfield, a successful Irish-trained hurdler in the late 1970s. For a time it was classed at Grade 3 level, and it was promoted to Grade 2 status in 2008. It was downgraded to Grade 3 again in 2016.

Records
Leading jockey  (4 wins):
 Paul Carberry – Oa Baldixe (1999), Pandorama (2008), Fully Funded (2010), Busty Brown (2012), Apache Stronghold (2013)

Leading trainer  (7 wins):
 Gordon Elliott -  Mount Benbulben (2011), Free Expression (2014), Death Duty (2016), Samcro (2017), Fury Road (2019), Fakiera (2020), Hollow Games (2021)

Winners

See also
 Horse racing in Ireland
 List of Irish National Hunt races

References

 Racing Post:

 pedigreequery.com – Monksfield Novice Hurdle – Navan.

National Hunt races in Ireland
National Hunt hurdle races
Navan Racecourse
Recurring sporting events established in 1995
1995 establishments in Ireland